John S. Lewis (born June 27, 1941) is a Professor Emeritus of planetary science at the University of Arizona’s Lunar and Planetary Laboratory. His interests in the chemistry and formation of the Solar System and the economic development of space have made him a leading proponent of turning potentially hazardous near-Earth objects into attractive space resources.

Career
The son of John Simpson Lewis, a YMCA professional, and Elsie Dinsmore Vandenbergh, a school teacher. Lewis received his B.S. in chemistry from Princeton University in 1962 as a National Merit Scholar.  He then continued his education at Dartmouth College receiving his M.A. in inorganic chemistry in 1964. He received his Ph.D in geochemistry and cosmochemistry from University of California, San Diego in 1968, where he studied under Harold Urey. Prior to joining the University of Arizona, Lewis taught space sciences and cosmochemistry at the Massachusetts Institute of Technology.

An expert on the composition and chemistry of asteroids and comets, Lewis has written such popular science books as Rain of Iron and Ice and Mining the Sky: Untold Riches from the Asteroids, Comets, and Planets. Lewis is a frequent commentator on the Chinese network CCTV when China broadcasts its major missions live.

He was a member of the Board of Directors of American Rocket Company and is currently Chief Scientist at Deep Space Industries.

Raised a Presbyterian, Lewis became a Mormon, in 1980.

In February 2013, Lewis assumed the role of Chief Scientist for the firm Deep Space Industries. Lewis focuses on strategic planning, mission development and processing concepts for Deep Space.

Publications

See also
Marshall Savage - author of The Millennial Project: Colonizing the Galaxy in Eight Easy Steps
Gerard O'Neill - author of The High Frontier: Human Colonies in Space
James Benson - founder of the SpaceDev company
The Case for Mars: The Plan to Settle the Red Planet and Why We Must by Robert Zubrin
Engines of Creation by K. Eric Drexler
Asteroid 3554 Amun

References

External links
John Lewis's web page  at the University of Arizona.
Personal blog 
The Extraterrestrial Commodities Market airspacemag.com

1941 births
Living people
American astronomers
Planetary scientists
Princeton University alumni
Dartmouth College alumni
University of California, San Diego alumni
Massachusetts Institute of Technology School of Science faculty
Space colonization
University of Arizona faculty